Talfaza Jaya  is a 2006 film.

Synopsis
Malga is a quiet village in the South of Tunisia that beats to the rhythm of the national holidays for which the Cultural Committee proposes the same program year after year. However, a phone call from the capital warns them that this year a German TV crew is going to visit the area. The Cultural Committee decides it has to offer a positive image of the village, and the country, and dives head-first into a tremendous work of set dressing to conceal the truth.

External links

 

2006 films
Tunisian comedy films